Hamelia papillosa is a species of flowering plant in the coffee family, Rubiaceae, that is endemic to Jamaica.

References

External links

papillosa
Flora of Jamaica
Vulnerable plants
Endemic flora of Jamaica
Taxonomy articles created by Polbot